Fox is an unincorporated community in Pickaway County, in the U.S. state of Ohio.

History
A post office called Fox was established in 1891, and remained in operation until 1904. Besides the post office, Fox had a blacksmith shop and country store.

References

Unincorporated communities in Pickaway County, Ohio
Unincorporated communities in Ohio